Luca Margaroli (born 15 February 1992) is a Swiss tennis player.

Margaroli has a career high ATP singles ranking of 692, achieved on 23 October 2017. He also has a career high ATP doubles ranking of 128 achieved on 6 June 2019.

Margaroli made his ATP main draw doubles debut at the 2015 Geneva Open where he partnered Henri Laaksonen receiving a wildcard. At the 2015 Swiss Open Gstaad, Margaroli was also given a wildcard into the doubles event partnering Laaksonen. The pair defeated Santiago Giraldo and Feliciano López in the first round.

Challenger and Futures finals

Doubles: 60 (26–34)

External links
 
 

1992 births
Living people
Swiss male tennis players
Sportspeople from Brescia
Sportspeople from Lugano
Swiss-Italian people